The following is a list of ecoregions in Jordan defined by the World Wide Fund for Nature (WWF).

Terrestrial ecoregions
Jordan is in the Palearctic realm. Ecoregions are listed by biome.

Temperate grasslands, savannas, and shrublands
 Middle East steppe

Mediterranean forests, woodlands, and scrub
 Eastern Mediterranean conifer-sclerophyllous-broadleaf forests

Deserts and xeric shrublands
 Arabian Desert
 Mesopotamian shrub desert
 Red Sea Nubo-Sindian tropical desert and semi-desert

Freshwater ecoregions
 Jordan River
 Arabian Interior
 Southwestern Arabian Coast

Marine ecoregions
 Northern and Central Red Sea

References

 
ecoregions
Jordan